Miguel Guirao Cano (born 5 February 1996) is a Spanish footballer who plays for FC Cartagena B. Mainly a left winger, he can also play as a left back.

Club career
Born in Murcia, Guirao started his youth career with his local club, Real Murcia. On 15 December 2012, aged only 16, he made his professional debut by coming on as a late substitute for Jorge García in a 0–1 Segunda División home loss against CD Guadalajara; he was the second youngest player to debut for the club.

On 24 August 2014 Guirao terminated his contract and returned to youth football with UD Almería. On 14 July of the following year he was promoted to the reserves, playing in the Segunda División B.

On 6 July 2016, Guirao was loaned to another third-tier club, FC Cartagena, for a year. However, he spent the whole campaign sidelined due to knee injuries.

On 28 July 2017, Guirao joined FC Jumilla, also in a temporary deal. The following 31 January, after being sparingly used, he moved to fellow third-tier side CF Lorca Deportiva, also on loan.

References

External links

1996 births
Living people
Spanish footballers
Footballers from Murcia
Association football wingers
Segunda División players
Segunda División B players
Tercera División players
Tercera Federación players
Real Murcia players
UD Almería B players
FC Cartagena footballers
FC Jumilla players
Mar Menor FC players
FC Cartagena B players
Spain youth international footballers